Lalji Tandon (12 April 193521 July 2020) was an Indian politician who served as the 18th Governor of Madhya Pradesh and 28th Governor of Bihar. He had also served as a member of parliament from 1996 until 2014 and as the Leader of the Opposition of the Legislative Assembly of Uttar Pradesh from 2003 until 2007. He was a member of Bharatiya Janata Party (BJP) and a protégé of Atal Bihari Vajpayee.

Early life 
Tandon was born in Chowk village in Lucknow, United Provinces, British India to Shivnarayan Tandon and Annpurna Devi, in a Hindu Khatri family. He graduated from Kalicharan Degree College. Tandon married Krishna Tandon on 26 February 1958, with whom he had three sons.

Career
Tandon was a member of Uttar Pradesh Vidhan Parishad (Legislative Council) for two terms, from 1978 until 1984 and remained the Leader of the House, of the Council from 1990 to 1996. Subsequently, he remained a member of Legislative Assembly (MLA) for three terms, 1996–2009, and remained the Leader of Opposition in the Assembly from 2003 to 2007. He had also served as Urban Development minister in the Uttar Pradesh cabinet under Mayawati (in the BSP-BJP alliance), and also in the Kalyan Singh ministry earlier.

Tandon was the leader of opposition in the Uttar Pradesh Legislative Assembly from 2003 to 2007.

On his birthday in April 2004, he was distributing free saris to poor women when a stampede broke out, killing 21 people. He was cleared of wrongdoing in this matter.

In May 2009, he was elected to the 15th Lok Sabha from Lucknow by a margin over 40,000 votes over Rita Bahuguna Joshi of Indian National Congress. The seat was earlier held by former BJP President Atal Bihari Vajpayee since 1991 for four consecutive terms. Despite enormous electoral spending, Akhilesh Das of the Bahujan Samaj Party (BSP) polled third, trailing by 70,000 votes.

As a Governor of Bihar, he was praised for streamlining academic activities of the state universities.

On 20 July 2019, he was appointed the 18th Governor of Madhya Pradesh, replacing Anandiben Patel.

Other works
In 2018, Tandon wrote a book Ankaha which was launched by the Vice President of India Venkaiah Naidu.

Death and legacy
Tandon died on 21 July 2020 at Medanta Hospital, Lucknow, from Covid-19, at the age of 85. His son Ashutosh Tandon announced his death.

Lalji Tandon Foundation was formed in October 2020. This foundation will be chaired by Gopal Tandon and will implement public services.

In July 2020, two roads in Uttar Pradesh were proposed to be named after Tandon. In December 2020, in another proposal, a boxing hall bearing the name of Tandon is to be built in Chowk Stadium, Lucknow.

Chancellor’s award to provide fillip to ‘best’ colleges, universities started by Chancellor Lalji Tandon. 

Rajnath Singh unveils statue of Lalji Tandon on his first death anniversary in Lucknow. 

Guv created Limca record for largest collective reading - Single Theme - Across Madhya Pradesh

References

External links
 Official biographical sketch in Parliament of India website

|-

|-

|-

1935 births
2020 deaths
People from Lucknow district
Bharatiya Janata Party politicians from Uttar Pradesh
India MPs 2009–2014
Uttar Pradesh MLAs 1997–2002
Members of the Uttar Pradesh Legislative Council
Uttar Pradesh MLAs 2002–2007
Uttar Pradesh MLAs 2007–2012
Lok Sabha members from Uttar Pradesh
Leaders of the Opposition in the Uttar Pradesh Legislative Assembly
Governors of Madhya Pradesh
University of Lucknow alumni
Governors of Bihar
Deaths from the COVID-19 pandemic in India